The Centennial Lake Provincial Nature Reserve (also known as Centennial Lake Provincial Park) is a provincial park located in the municipality of Greater Madawaska, Renfrew County, in Eastern Ontario, Canada. The  reserve was created in 1989 and is managed by Ontario Parks.

The park consists of 5 non-contiguous parts. The majority of the park is a section of land north of Black Donald Lake surrounding Oakhill Lake and bordered on the east by the Black Donald Creek; another part is the largest island in Black Donald Lake, and the remaining 3 parts are portions of three smaller islets in the same lake.

The park protects unusual geological features and many rare plant species, including the Purple cliffbrake (Pellaea atropurpurea). It is a non-operating park, meaning there are no facilities or services.

See also
Centennial Lake (Renfrew County) - nearby namesake lake

References

External links

Nature reserves in Ontario
Protected areas of Renfrew County